Teso North is a constituency in Kenya. It is one of seven constituencies in Busia County.

References 

Constituencies in Busia County